Jorge Próspero de Verboom, 1st Marquess of Verboom (9 January 1665 – 19 January 1744), was a Flemish-born military engineer in the service of the King of Spain. On , King Philip V granted him the title of Marquess of Verboom.

His father was Cornelius Verboom, the Flemish engineer-in chief-of the Spanish Netherlands, in charge of the fortification of Besançon and of Dôle, in France. Prospero Jorge joined the Spanish Military Engineering Academy of Brussels, under the Alferez Sebastián Fernández de Medrano, director of that military academy.

During the Nine Years' War, Prospero was instrumental in the 1691 campaign by William III of Orange against the French blockade of Mons. In 1695, he directed the siege of Namur with Dutch military engineer Menno van Coehoorn. He was promoted to field marshal of the Spanish cavalry and, two years later, commanded the Lorraine Regiment of Cavalry.

In the Spanish War of Succession, Verboom was in command of Antwerp's defenses in 1702. He also took part in the siege of Hulst along with Captain General Isidro de la Cueva-Benavides. In 1706, the Frenco-Spanish Army—commanded by François de Neufville, duc de Villeroi—was defeated by troops commanded by the Duke of Marlborough at the Battle of Ramillies. Troops from Antwerp were used to put pressure on the British at the siege of Termonde. In 1709, Verboom was instructed to report on the state of castles and garrisons along the Spain–Portugal border.

He participated in the Battle of Almenar of 1710 against Count Guido Starhemberg, where he was captured. He was imprisoned until 1712. He took a very active part in the conquest of Barcelona and—after its capture—moved there in 1718, where he would supervise work on the Ciudadela of Barcelona and take part in planning the War of the Quadruple Alliance – to recover Sardinia and Sicily. He took on the role of acting Captain General of Catalonia between 1737 and 1738.

References 

1665 births
1744 deaths
Flemish military engineers
Spanish generals
Engineers from Brussels
Military personnel of the Spanish Netherlands
Captains General of Catalonia
Engineers of the Spanish Netherlands